Pleurotomella amphiblestrum is a species of sea snail, a marine gastropod mollusk in the family Raphitomidae.

Description
The length of this shell attains 7.5 mm, its diameter 2.5 mm.

Distribution
This marine species occurs in the Gulf of Oman

References

External links
 MELVILL, J. COSMO. "DESCRIPTIONS OF TWENTY-THREE SPECIES OF GASTROPODA FROM THE PERSIAN GULF, GULF OF OMAN, AND ARABIAN SEA, DREDGED BY MR. FW TOWNSEND, OF THE INDOEUROPEAN TELEGRAPH SERVICE, IN 1903." Journal of Molluscan Studies 6.1 (1904): 51-60 
 

amphiblestrum
Gastropods described in 1904